Jeanette Testu (1900 – January 10, 1964) was an American politician who served eight terms in the Washington House of Representatives between 1943 and 1963.  In her last term, she served as Speaker Pro Tempore.  She represented Washington's 34th legislative district as a Democrat.  She served on numerous committees in her time in the legislature, including terms as chair of the Transportation Committee (1949–1951), Colleges and Universities Committee (1951–1953), and Memorials Committee (1953–1955).

Beyond the legislature
Testu married in 1920 and had three children.  She ran unsuccessfully for Seattle City Council in 1944 and 1954, served as a Deputy Sheriff of King County from 1957 to 1960, and was a Democratic National Committeewoman. She also served on the World's Fair Commission starting when it was expanded in 1961, where she was the only woman.

She was affiliated with numerous organizations, including the American Legion, Business and Professional Women, Eagles, Elks, and Supreme Emblem Club, as well as a community service role with the YMCA.  In 1961, the State Federation of Democratic Women's Clubs named here Woman of the Year.

References

Further reading
Articles:
 “Democratic Women’s Activities in Washington,” The Washington State Democrat, Women’s Legislative Council of Washington, November, 1941
 “Mrs. Jeanette Testu Dies in Mexico City,” Seattle Daily Times, January 10, 1964

Internet:
 Jeanette Testu papers, 1933-1962, University of Washington, Special Collection Manuscripts/Archives

Book:
 Ray Moore: An Oral History, interviewed by Sharon Boswell, Washington State Oral History Program, Office of the Secretary of State, 1999

1900 births
1964 deaths
Democratic Party members of the Washington House of Representatives
Women state legislators in Washington (state)